José Antonio Aysa Bernat (born 11 January 1943) is a Mexican politician from the Institutional Revolutionary Party. From 2009 to 2012 he served as Deputy of the LXI Legislature of the Mexican Congress representing Tabasco.

References

1943 births
Living people
Politicians from Campeche
Institutional Revolutionary Party politicians
21st-century Mexican politicians
National Autonomous University of Mexico alumni
Academic staff of the National Autonomous University of Mexico
Deputies of the LXI Legislature of Mexico
Members of the Chamber of Deputies (Mexico) for Tabasco